Yocum is a surname. Notable people with the surname include:

Matt Yocum (born 1968), American motorsports reporter
Seth Hartman Yocum, member of the U.S. House of Representatives from Pennsylvania
Vern Yocum, copyist and librarian for musicians

See also
24021 Yocum, main-belt asteroid
Yoakam
Yoakum (disambiguation)